Émile Durkheim: His Life and Work is a 1972 biography of the sociologist Emile Durkheim written by Steven Lukes.

Bibliography

External links 

 Full text at the Internet Archive

1972 non-fiction books
English-language books
Émile Durkheim
Biographies (books)
Harper & Row books